Events from the year 1951 in Taiwan, Republic of China. This year is numbered Minguo 40 according to the official Republic of China calendar.

Incumbents
 President – Chiang Kai-shek
 Vice President – Li Zongren
 Premier – Chen Cheng
 Vice Premier – Chang Li-sheng

Events

January
 1 January – The restructuring of Taiwan Cement Limited Corporation to be Taiwan Cement Corporation.
 21 January – The establishment of Taoyuan County Council.

February
 24 February – The establishment of Yilan County Council.

May
 21 May – The establishment of TransAsia Airways.

July
 15 July – The establishment of Fu Hsing Kang College in Taipei.

September
 11 September – The opening of Neiwan Line of Taiwan Railways Administration (Neiwan Station).
 16 September – The launching of United Daily News.

October
 10 October – 40th Double Ten Day.
 22 October – The start of East Rift Valley earthquakes in eastern Taiwan.

Births
 9 January – Ho Mei-yueh, Minister of Council for Economic Planning and Development (2007–2008).
 23 January – Hsu Tain-tsair, Mayor of Tainan (2001–2010).
 13 February – Lin Ming-chen, Magistrate of Nantou County.
 9 March – Kao Kuang-chi, Minister of National Defense (2015–2016).
 15 March – Lin Yu-fang, member of 8th Legislative Yuan (2008-2016).
 20 March – Liu Shou-ch'eng, Magistrate of Yilan County (1997–2005).
 22 March – Yang Wen-ke, Magistrate-elect of Hsinchu County.
 17 April – Chin Hsiao-hui, Deputy Minister of Veterans Affairs Council.
 4 June – Uliw Qaljupayare, member of Legislative Yuan (2008-2017).
 6 June – Chen Chien-jen, Vice President of the Republic of China.
 8 June – Shih Shou-chien, Director of National Palace Museum (2004–2006).
 15 June – Wu Ching-ji, Minister of Education (2009–2012).
 17 June – Twu Shiing-jer, Mayor of Chiayi City.
 20 June – Lai Shyh-bao, member of 7th, 8th and 9th Legislative Yuan.
 1 August – Lee Chin-yung, Magistrate of Yunlin County.
 23 August – Hung Chi-chang, Chairman of Straits Exchange Foundation (2007–2008).
 8 September – Ker Chien-ming, acting Chairman of Democratic Progressive Party (2004–2005).
 25 October – Cho Shih-chao, Vice Minister of Economic Affairs (2014–2016).
 31 October – Hsiao Yeh, novelist and screenwriter.
 8 November – Luo Ying-shay, Minister of Justice (2013–2016).
 10 November – Betty Pei Ti, actress.
 29 November – Lee Sush-der, Minister of Finance (2008–2012).
 4 December – Chang Fei, singer.
 13 December – Lin Chuan, Premier of the Republic of China (2016–2017).

Deaths
 25 August – Chen Guofu, Governor of Jiangsu Province (1933–1937).

References

 
Years of the 20th century in Taiwan